The Kansas Turnpike Authority (KTA) is the organization that owns and maintains the Kansas Turnpike.

Authority board
The KTA is headed by a board of five members, two of which are appointed by the governor of the state. In addition, the Chairman of the Kansas Senate Transportation Committee as well as a member of the Kansas House Transportation Committee also serve on the board. The current secretary of the Kansas Department of Transportation is the fifth member of the board and also serves as the director of operations.

One board member is elected as the chairman of the board by the other four members. The current chairman is David Lindstrom, a Kansas City-area businessman and former Johnson County Commissioner and Kansas City Chiefs defensive end.

The KTA board consults with the CEO in approving major contracts, policies and the annual budget. Board members, as listed on the KTA web site, are below:
 David Lindstrom, Chairman
 Sen. Mike Petersen
 Rep. Richard J. Proehl
 Sen. Ty Masterson
 Richard Carlson, Secretary of Transportation

Organization
The KTA employs over 400 people who are charged with maintaining, preserving, and redesigning the  roadway and improving its function as a vital corridor to move people and goods in Kansas. These employees are led by the KTA's Chief Executive Officer, who reports to the KTA board, and a nine-member leadership team.

Authority Board
Chief Executive Officer
Director of Engineering
Director of Technology
Director of Finance
KTA General Counsel
Director of Roadway Operations
Director of Business Services and Customer Relations
Commander of Kansas Highway Patrol Troop G
Human Resources Manager
Executive Assistant

References

External links
 
 Kansas Department of Transportation website

Toll road authorities of the United States
Toll roads in Kansas